WDOR-FM (93.9 FM) is a radio station licensed to Sturgeon Bay, Wisconsin, United States and serving the Sturgeon Bay, Wisconsin area, as well as Door and Kewaunee Counties along with Green Bay to the South.

WDOR AM/FM both broadcast a Full Service/Adult Contemporary format.

History
Broadcasting first in 1951 at 910 AM and later adding an FM in 1966, originally on 95.9 before moving to its current 93.9 in 1973, WDOR has been the "Heart of the Door Peninsula" for over 50 years.  Door County Broadcasting Co. Inc. and the Allen family and a few minority stockholders have owned WDOR for over half a century.  On the basis of broadcast range and wattage, WDOR-FM is a regional superstation, and can also be heard across Lake Michigan in the Frankfort and Manistee, Michigan areas. The WDOR-FM tower is also shared with WRMW.

Programming
Programming includes local talk shows, local news, ABC News Radio, and a music mix of Oldies, 1980s, 1990s & today's adult contemporary. Sports programming includes local high school sports, Door County League Baseball, Wisconsin Badgers Football and Basketball, and the Milwaukee Brewers.

External links
 WDOR official website
 
 
 

DOR-FM
News and talk radio stations in the United States
Mainstream adult contemporary radio stations in the United States
Oldies radio stations in the United States
Sports radio stations in the United States